is a Japanese female professional ten-pin bowler. She is a member of the Ladies Bowling Organization of Japan, license no. 1. In April 2010, Shimizu officially resigned from the Japan Professional Bowling Association (JPBA), and joined the LBO. She currently holds the office of vice-chairperson with the LBO.

Major accomplishments 
 2005 - 21st Rokko Queens　(winner)
 2006 - Miyazaki Pro/Amateur Open　(winner)
 2006 - BIGBOX Higashiyamato Cup　(winner)
 2006 - 38th Japan National Championships　(winner)
 2007 - Gunma Open　(winner)
 2008 - Chiba Women's Open (winner)
 2008 - Karuizawa Prince Cup　(winner)
 2008 - Tokai Women's Open　(winner)

DHC Tour
 DHC Ladies Bowling Tour 2006 - 6th leg　(winner)
 DHC Ladies Bowling Tour 2006/2007 - 1st leg　(winner)
 DHC Ladies Bowling Tour 2006/2007 - 4th leg (winner)

P★League
 P★League - Tournament 6　(winner)
 P★League - Tournament 8　(winner)
 P★League - Tournament 15　(winner)

References

External links 
Profile @ P-League

1977 births
Living people
Sportspeople from Chiba Prefecture
Japanese ten-pin bowling players
Bowlers at the 2002 Asian Games
Asian Games competitors for Japan